is an air carrier based at Yao Airport in Yao, Osaka Prefecture, Japan. It operates interisland passenger service in Okinawa Prefecture and provides sightseeing flights, flight training, a flying club and other irregular services at Yao Airport and Hiroshima-Nishi Airport.

Destinations
First Flying's service in Okinawa follows a timetable, but is not scheduled service, and therefore flights may be cancelled if there are no passengers.

 Japan
 Aguni Airport
 Naha Airport
 Okinoerabu Airport
 Tokunoshima Airport

First Flying plans to resume service between New Ishigaki Airport, Hateruma Airport and Tarama Airport around October 2015 using Twin Otter aircraft.

Fleet
First Flying operates the following fleet:

References

External links
 First Flying website 

Airlines of Japan
Airlines established in 1966
Companies based in Osaka Prefecture
1966 establishments in Japan